Barddhaman Junction Railway Station (Station code: BWN) is a railway junction station on the Howrah–Delhi main line and is located in Purba Bardhaman District in the Indian state of West Bengal. EMU services from  along Howrah–Bardhaman main line and Howrah–Bardhaman chord terminate at Bardhaman. Everyday 300+ express/mail/SF trains hault here making it one of the most busiest and important junction railway station in Eastern India. It serves Bardhaman, the third most populous city in West Bengal.

History
Barddhaman Junction is an important station in the Eastern Railway zone. Deen Dayal Upadhyay, DDU), Gaya etc. go through the station. The station consists of 8 platforms.

The Howrah–Bardhaman chord, a shorter link to Bardhaman from Howrah than the Howrah–Bardhaman main line, was constructed in 1917.

Burdwan–Katwa line was upgraded from NG to BG in 2014 (up to ) and extended up to Katwa in 2018.

Barddhaman RRI
It has Siemens interlocking and it was commissioned on 2014. New route relay interlocking (RRI) has considerably increased train punctuality.

Electrification
Electrification of Howrah–Burdwan main line was completed with 25 kV AC overhead system in 1958. Earlier, electrification started (on the Howrah–Bandel sector) with 3 kV DC overhead system in 1953.

The Howrah–Bardhaman chord was electrified in 1964–66.
Bardhaman–Katwa line was electrified in 2014 (up to ) and 2018 (up to Katwa jn)

Amenities
Barddhaman railway station has two-bedded non-AC retiring rooms and four bedded non-AC dormitory. The station platforms are equipped with high speed WIFI access provided by Google and RailWire.  All platforms are equipped with escalators (1-8) with Lift facility in platform number 6-7. Automated ticket vending machines are there at both side of the station where tickets can be got both by giving cash, using card, UTS mobile system etc. IRCTC Vendors are available with various types of food at the station platforms. Purified and cold water is available at platforms.

Bardhaman Coaching & Wagon Depot
Bardhaman Coaching & Wagon Depot can maintain passenger trains EMU and MEMU, including one DEMU rake. It has a capacity of holding 71 coaches.

Diesel & Electric Loco Shed
Bardhaman has a diesel loco shed with WDG-3A, WDM-6,  WDM-2 and WDM-3A locos. Recently BWN DLS has been electrified. A 15 WAG-9 locomotive from Kalyan Loco Shed and 10 WAG-9 locomotive from Gomoh Loco Shed are transferred to BWN.  It has parking slots for EMUs

Incidents 
On two different dates, April 6 and 13 of 2003, employees of a private security agency fired at fleeing coal thieves, injuring a passerby and on the later date, a hawker. Following these incidents, a large mob comprising the station's hawkers and residents of the area, clashed with police forces leading to a baton charge and arrests, on April 14, 2003.

On Friday, 9 November 2019, several people were injured in a stampede over a footbridge at the station.

On Saturday, 4 January 2020, a major portion of the main entrance gate of the railway station collapsed, injuring several people. Construction activities were taking place at the site of the accident.

Gallery

References

External links
Trains at Bardhaman
 

Railway stations in Purba Bardhaman district
Howrah railway division
Railway junction stations in West Bengal
Kolkata Suburban Railway stations
Buildings and structures in Bardhaman